This is a list of submissions to the 61st Academy Awards for Best Foreign Language Film. The Academy Award for Best Foreign Language Film was created in 1956 by the Academy of Motion Picture Arts and Sciences to honour non-English-speaking films produced outside the United States. The award is handed out annually, and is accepted by the winning film's director, although it is considered an award for the submitting country as a whole. Countries are invited by the Academy to submit their best films for competition according to strict rules, with only one film being accepted from each country.

For the 61st Academy Awards, thirty-one films were submitted in the category Academy Award for Best Foreign Language Film. The Soviet film, Commissar, was filmed in 1967, but was banned for twenty years. The bolded titles were the five nominated films, which came from Belgium, Hungary, India, Spain and the eventual winner, Pelle the Conqueror, from Denmark.

Submissions

Notes

  The Dutch submission, the thriller The Vanishing, was disqualified by the Oscar committee. AMPAS complained that less than 50% of the dialogue in the film was in Dutch, and that French was the majority language. Although the film was made by the Netherlands with a French-Dutch filmmaker and a mixed cast (mostly Dutch), AMPAS deemed that the film was not suitable to represent the Netherlands. The Netherlands declined to send another film, leaving them unrepresented for the first time since 1972.

References

61